The following is a timeline of events during the Central African Republic Civil War.

2012

December 
 10 December: Rebels took control of cities of N'Délé, Sam Ouandja and Ouadda
 15 December: Rebels took control of Bamingui
 18 December: Rebels took control of Bria
 19 December: Rebels took control of Kabo
 22 December: Rebels took control of Ippy and Ndassima
 24 December: Rebels took control of Bambari
 25 December: Rebels took control of Kaga-Bandoro
 28 December: 
 Government counteroffensive on Bambari was repelled
 Rebels took control of Dekoa.
 29 December: Rebels took control of Sibut

2013

January 
 5 January: Rebels took control of Alindao
 11 January: Peace agreement was signed
 20–21 January: Rebels took control of Dimbi and Kembé.
 30 January: Rebels took control of Kouango

February 
 8 February: Rebels took control of Mobaye.

March 
 1 March: Rebels took control of Moyenne-Sido
 12 March: Rebels took control of Rafai
 18 March: Rebels took control of Gambo and Bangassou
 21 March: Rebels took control of Damara, Bouca and Bossangoa
 23 March: 
Rebels took control of power plant in Boali and shut off power to the city.
Rebels entered Bangui
Rebels took control of Bossembélé
 24 March: Rebels reached the presidential palace in the centre of the capital.
 25 March: Séléka leader Michel Djotodia, who served after the January agreement as First Deputy Prime Minister for National Defense, declared himself President, becoming the first Muslim to ever hold the office. Djotodia said that there would be a three-year transitional period and that Nicolas Tiangaye would continue to serve as Prime Minister.
 28 March: Séléka forces moved to western part of CAR, capturing Paoua, Bouar and Nola

April 
 2 April: FDPC withdrew from Seleka coalition. In response Seleka launched heavy attack on FDPC positions near Baboua killing some fighters.

August 
 30 August: LRA established their base in Fodé in Mbomou.

September 
 1 September: anti-Balaka was formed in
 6 September: Anti-balaka attacked Zéré on the road between Bouca and Bossangoa killing at least 55 civilians.
 9 September: Anti-balaka attacked Seleka in Bouca.
 13 September: Djotodia formally disbanded Seleka.
 17 September: Anti-balaka attacked Bossangoa.
  Revolution and Justice (RJ) was formed in Ouham-Pendé prefecture

October 
 10 October: 30 Seleka fighters who were occupying Bangassou were arrested by authorities.
 13 October: Anti-balaka took control of Gaga after six days of battle with Seleka.
 26 October: anti-Balaka attacked Séléka in Bouar (fr)

November 
 1 November: RJ established training camp in Boloum near Paoua.
 10 November: Séléka attacked Anti-balaka in Camp Bangui town north of Yaloke burning many homes.

December 
 5 December: 
 French forces started operation Sangaris
 Anti-balaka attacked Bangui. Fleeing residents create IDP camp at M'Poko airport.
 12 December: anti-Balaka killed 27 civilians in Bohong (fr)
 24 December: RJ attacked Beboura killing 45 Seleka fighters.

2014

January 
 8 January: Séléka withdrew from Boyali. Same day anti-Balaka attack killed local Muslims leading to return of Séléka forces which committed another massacre
 10 January: Michel Djotodia resigned. Alexandre-Ferdinand Nguendet became transitional president.
 13 January: Séléka withdrew from Bozoum
 16 January: Anti-balaka entered Bossembélé killing 43 people
 17 January: 
Séléka withdrew from Bossemptélé
Séléka withdrew from Boali. 300 anti-Balaka fighters entered town killing four civilians
 18 January: anti-Balaka attacked  Bossemptélé killing 100 people (fr)
 20 January: Séléka withdrew from Baoro. Two days later clashes erupted between anti-Balaka and local Muslim population resulting in 100 deaths (fr) 
 22 January: Heavy clashes erupted in Boguila between RJ and Seleka leading to 22 Seleka fighters being killed.
 24 January:
 Joseph Kalite, former minister, was murdered by Anti-balaka outside Bangui
 RJ took control of Bojomo on Boguila-Markounda axis after killing 13 Seleka fighters.
 27 January: Séléka leaders left Bangui under the escort of Chadian peacekeepers.
 28 January: Séléka withdrew from Kasai military camp in Bangui. Remaining fighters were surrounded in Beal, RDOT and BSS camps in First District.
 29 January: Séléka withdrew from Boda leaving town largely under Anti-Balaka control
 30 January: Séléka withdrew from Berberati
 FPR took control of Bang, town on border with Chad and Cameroon
 Anti-Balaka took control of Beloko border crossing with Cameroon
 RJ took control of Paoua.

February 

 1 February: Séléka withdrew from Carnot leaving city under anti-Balaka control
 2 February: Séléka withdrew from Sibut
 12 February: Anti-balaka captured Nola
 26 February: French forces arrived in Beloko border crossing forcing anti-Balaka to move to illegal crossing south of town
 RJ took control of Bang after clashes with FPR
 Central African Republic was de facto divided with Séléka controlling northern parts of country and Anti-balaka controlling southern and western parts. Government control was limited to capital city, Bangui.

March 
 10 March: Anti-balaka captured Bayanga sub-prefecture
 18 March: MISCA dismantled Anti-balaka checkpoints between Nola and Berbérati recovering six shotguns
 29 March: RJ captured Bedaka north of Paoua after clashes with Séléka forces

April 
 10 April: United Nations Multidimensional Integrated Stabilization Mission in the Central African Republic (MINUSCA) was formed
 13 April: 
 Heavy clashes between anti-Balaka and Séléka erupted in Grimari (fr)
 Last Chad forces left Central African Republic after accusations of supporting Séléka
 22 April: ex-Séléka captured Bouca
 30 April: European Union Military Operation in the Central African Republic took control of Bangui M'Poko International Airport

May 
 1 May: Seleka recaptured Markounda from RJ.
 5 May: French forces repel Seleka attack on Boguila (fr)
 28 May: ex-Séléka fighters threw grenades and discharged firearms at Church of Fatima in Bangui killing at least 11 people
 Late May: FACA recaptured Bayanga subprefecture from Anti-balaka
 IDP camp at Bangui airport houses 60,000 people

June 
 10 June: Popular Front for the Rebirth of Central African Republic (FPRC) was formed in Birao
 23 June: Rebels captured Birao Airport
 24 June: 100 Anti-balaka fighters attacked Bambari. 46 people were killed and 28 wounded.
 26 June: FACA and international forces left Birao after FPRC ultimatum

July 
 1 July: RJ left Bang after MISCA ultimatum
 23 July: Ceasefire between Anti-balaka and ex-Seleka is signed in Brazzaville
 30 July: heavy clashes erupted between Anti-balaka and ex-Seleka in Batangafo resulting in 20,000 people being displaces.

August 
 4 August: Heavy clashes erupted in Batangafo between Seleka and French convoy (fr)
 9 August: French forces withdrew from Batangafo leaving city to Seleka fighters

September 
 17 September: Ali Darassa formed Union for Peace in the Central African Republic (UPC)

November 
 RPRC split from FPRC.

December 
 1 December: FPRC entered Kaga-Bandoro.
 8 December: Abdel Kader Baba-Laddé, leader of FPR rebel group was arrested near Kabo

2015

May 
 15 May: Peace agreement was signed by 9 of 10 armed groups as a result of Bangui National Forum

July 
 Mahamat Al-Khatim formed Central African Patriotic Movement (MPC)

September 
 28 September: Anti-balakas stormed Ngaragba jail in Bangui freeing hundreds of inmates

December 
 Return, Reclamation, Rehabilitation (3R) militia was formed in Koui
 5 December: FACA took control of Boali from Anti-balaka
 14 December: Independence of Republic of Logone was announced in Kaga-Bandoro
 30 December: First round of general elections was held

2016

February 
 14 February: Second round of presidential elections was held

March 
 18 March: Berberati was declared to be free from rebel groups.
 30 March: Faustin-Archange Touadéra was sworn as a president

May 
 20 May: FDPC occupied Zoukombo village near Cameroonian border seizing local school.

June 
 8 June: Four rebel groups, including FPRC, UPC, MPC and anti-Balaka signed peace agreement in Mbres

September 
 27 September:
 3R captured De Gaulle town (now Koui) killing at least 17 civilians.
 Boda, Carnot and Nola were declared to be free from rebel groups.

October 
 30 October: France ended operation Sangaris

November 
 30 November: FPRC captured Bakala after battle with UPC

December 
 11 December: UPC recaptured Bakala after battle with FPRC

2017

January 
 11 January: FPRC again captured Bakala

February 
 22 February: Ali Darassa and most rebels from Union for Peace in the Central African Republic withdrew from Bambari. Anti-balaka leader followed shortly after.

March 
 20–24 March: FPRC and Anti-balaka took control of Bakouma and Nzacko after expelling UPC fighters.

April 
 19 April: Uganda announced that it would begin withdrawing forces from the Central African Republic where it has been trying to hunt down Joseph Kony in the country for 9 years.

May 

 2 May: 3R seized control of Niem in Koui sub-prefecture
 9 May: UPC repelled Anti-Balaka attack on Alindao
 13 May: Anti-Balaka forces attacked Bangassou killing more than 30 people and displacing thousands
 14 May: 3R withdraws from Niem
 15 May: MINUSCA retook most of Bangassou freeing hostages
 18 May: Heavy clashes erupted between Anti-balaka and ex-Seleka in Bria resulting in 26 deaths.

June 
 6 June: FPRC attacked anti-Balaka positions in Nzako. 18 civilians were killed
 11 June: FPRC captured Nzacko from Anti-balaka
 28 June: Ugandan forces withdrew from Zemio. Armed Muslims entered town killing at least 28 civilians

September 
 18 September: FACA was deployed in Anti-balaka-held Bouar
 23 September: 3R captured Bocaranga from Anti-balaka

December 
 New rebel groups, Siriri, emerged in western part of Mambéré-Kadéï prefecture.

2018

January 
 12 January: MINUSCA launched operation Mbaranga securing Paoua city and forcing armed groups to move 50 km from city
 20 January: Heavy clashes broke out between RJ and MNLC north of Paoua forcing 60,000 people to seek refugee in city
 25 January: FACA was deployed in Paoua
 30 January: Revolution and Justice voluntarily dissolved itself

March 
 3 March: UPC captured Rafai subprefecture
 6 March: Anti-balaka recaptured Rafai

April 
 7–8 April: MINUSCA and FACA launched operation to disarm PK5 self-defense groups. One peacekeeper was killed and security forces were forced to withdraw from the area.

May 
 8–9 May: FACA was deployed in Sibut with the help of Russian instructors
 MNLC merged with MPC

June 

 21 June: FACA was deployed in Bangassou. Their convoy was attacked by UPC in Bambari leading to three people being wounded before reaching the destination.

August 
 17 August: FACA took control of Dekoa
 28 August: Four main rebel groups, including anti-Balaka, FPRC, UPC and MPC signed peace agreement in Khartoum (fr)

October 
 31 October: Heavy clashes broke out between anti-Balaka and ex-Séléka fighters in Batangafo resulting in at least 15 deaths

November 
 15 November: At least 112 people were killed and 27 injured in UPC and Anti-balaka attacks on Alindao refugee camp.

December 
 5 December: Siriri merged with 3R.
 31 December: FPRC and UPC rebels took control of Bakouma

2019

January 
 7 January: FACA took control of Bocaranga from 3R forces without a fight
 10 January: UPC launched heavy attack on MINUSCA forces in Bambari
 12–3 January: Portuguese paratroopers raided UPC base in Bokolobo, seizing number of weapons and destroying some checkpoints
 17 January: 
 UPC attack on Bambari was repelled
 FACA with support of MINUSCA regained control of Bakouma
 29 January: 18 people were killed and 23 wounded when UPC fighters opened fire during funeral ceremony in Ippy

February 
 6 February: Fourteen armed groups signed Khartoum Agreement
 25 February: Firmin Ngrébada was appointed as a prime minister as a result of peace agreement

April 
 5 April: MINUSCA captured Zoukombo killing three FDPC fighters
 15 April: Ali Darassa, UPC leader, returned to Bambari following peace agreement

May 
 13–19 May: 3R captured areas in northwest part of Ouham-Pendé Prefecture on border with Cameroon
 21 May: 3R fighters killed 46 civilians in Ouham-Pendé prefecture

September 
 2 September: MLCJ took control of Birao
 27 September: Three people were killed when combat helicopter used by MINUSCA forces crashed in Bouar

October 
 4 October: FPRC repelled MLCJ attack on Tissi
 14 October: MLCJ took control of Am Dafok
 UPC entered Bambouti

November 
 19 November: FACA took control of Camp Beal in Bangui killing 10 ex-Seleka fighters

December 
 16 December: FPRC recaptured Am Dafok
 26 December: Security forces regained control over PK5 neighborhood in Bangui after local merchants killer 30 members of self-defense groups who ruled the area.

2020

January 
 10 January: 
 Former president Djotodia returned to country after six years
 UPC took control of several villages (Kollo, Kaboul 3, Zounguinza i Drochengba and Morouba) near Mingala.
 25–26 January: MLCJ attaced Bria capturing more than 60% of the city after 24 hours of clashes with FPRC.

February 
 1 February: Central African military forces (FACA) were deployed in UPC-held Alindao
 5 February: UPC allegedly withdrew from Bambouti
 17 February: FPRC attack on MINUSCA forces in Birao is repelled, leading to 12 FPRC forces being killed.

March 
 4 March: Heavy clashes erupted in N'Délé between FPRC and RPRC
 15 March: Clashes erupted between Anti-balaka and MINUSCA in Grimari

April 
 9 April: MINUSCA forces withdrew from Beboura in Ouham Pende after a crowd destroyed their base following a road accident.

May 
 1 May: 3R took control of Baboua. Despite partial disarmament group remains in control of big parts of Nana-Mambéré prefecture.
 5 May: 3R withdrew from Baboua to their base near Beloko
 9 May: FACA repelled UPC attack on Obo killing 11 militants
 13 May: 3R leader, Sidiki Abass, escaped from Bouar. His fighters disarmed local gendarmerie seizing Besson and Koundé
 18 May: FACA repelled another UPC attack on Obo
 20 May: FACA with support of MINUSCA repelled another UPC attack on Obo killing 12 militants
 27 May: 3R took control of Koundjili in Ouham-Pende. Local population fled to bush.

June 
 8 June: Prefect of Nana-Grébizi prefecture fled his residence in Kaga-Bandoro after demonstrators accused him of collaborating with MPC rebels in city. They ransacked his residence.
 9 June: 3R attacked USMS base in Wantiguira, located 8 km from Bouar with heavy weapons.
 20 June: Anti-balaka in Bozoum held a meeting demanding resignation of Ouham-Pende prefect accusing him of collaborating with 3R rebels.
 25 June: MPC took control of Boguila, Nana-Bakassa and Beboura following MINUSCA withdrawal
 30 June: Bangladeshi paratroopers from MINUSCA attacked 3R in Koui.

July 
 9 July: Demonstrators burned down police headquarters in Bagandou after police killed ex-Anti-balaka commander.
 11 July: Police forces from Bangui were sent to Bagandou to restore peace, however they were stopped by a crowd.
 13 July: A UN peacekeeper was killed and two others wounded in an ambush set up by the 3R militia.
 19 July: 3R forces attacked Ngbama village near Bocaranga kidnapping 40 people and stealing 50 million CFA francs.
 22 July: MINUSCA forces recaptured Niem from 3R forces.
 23 July: 3R forces captured Bang village near Ngaoundaye
 28 July: MINUSCA forces recaptured Besson from 3R forces.
 31 July: Janjaweed militias attacked village near Am Dafock killing more than 140 people and displacing thousands.

August 
 3 August: Anti-balaka attacked Grimari blocking roads to Sibut and Bambari. FACA managed to recapture city the same day killing one Anti-balaka commander.
 17 August: FACA captured Koui after battle with 3R.
 30 August: Local militias took control of Gaga town near Yaloké after clashes with FACA soldiers. They ransacked buildings of Chinese companies operating in the area.

September 
 2 September: FACA recaptured Gaga
 8 September: Three armed Anti-balaka fighters from Gaga raided home of brigade commander of Yaloké's gendarmerie and forced him to free one of their fighters who was arrested for looting. Local population organizer a protest against his decision.
 14 September: 3R briefly captured Bohong and Mbotoga before withdrawing later that day. Local population fled to bush.
 17 September: 3R captured four villages (Yambassa, Bavara, Bondja and Bimbi) near Paoua. They withdrew day later, but returned on 19 September.
 22 September: MINUSCA and FACA forces were sent to recapture Bavara from 3R but were forced to withdraw after their vehicles were unable to cross a bridge.
 27 September: 3R took control of Nanga-Boguila.
 28 September: 
 LRA kindapped 10 people in Likhoua village near Bambouti.
 3R placed land mines on a bridge in Moumdji near Bocaranga and set up checkpoint demanding payment for crossing the river.

October 
 1 October: Heavy clashes erupted in Ngaoundaye between 3R and MINUSCA after authorities tried to conduct voter registration in the area despite 3R's ban. Officials were forced to retreat.
 2 October: Traffic resumed at Moumdji bridge after Rwandan peacekeepers removed land mines.
 7 October: 3R took control of Nana-Bakassa.
 23 October: Clashes erupted between two factions of Anti-balaka in Batangafo. Clashes were also reported later between Anti-balaka and ex-Séléka in the city. Seven people were killed (including three civilians and four militiamen) and more than 100 injured.

November 
 19 November: FACA withdrew from Bozoum.
 21 November: Five people were killed and seven injured after clashes between UPC and FPRC in Aigbando, 70 km from Bria.
 22 November: 
 One person was killed and two injured after clashes between FACA and USMS forces in Paoua.
 UPC raided a South Sudanese village killed a local doctor.
 23 November: In response, self-defense forces from South Sudan attacked Bambouti, kicking UPC out of the city and killing some of their fighters. They withdrew a few hours later. UPC militants kidnapped the local mayor after returning to Bambouti.

December 
 1 December: Sudanese Arab militias attacked Boromata village. They were repulsed by Goula militias. A few people were killed.
 2 December: Fulani rebels attacked Ngouvota village near Kaga-Bandoro killing four people including pregnant woman. One rebel was killed by civilians.
 4 December: 
 After Constitutional Court cancelled candidacy of Francois Bozize in presidential elections armed Anti-balaka militias ransacked buildings of international organization in Bossangoa. In Bangui police surrounded some districts looking for Anti-balaka militants.
 MINUSCA set up a temporary operation base in Boromata following clashes.
 8 December: Clashes erupted between FACA and UPC rebels in Bambari resulting in a few rebels being killed.
 10 December: Sudanese Arab militias attacked Ndélembé village near Birao injuring a few people. They were repulsed  after 13 hours by forces from Boromata.
 15 December: 
 Anti-balaka leader, Yvon Konaté, was arrested near Bossembélé while travelling to Bossangoa. Group of armed men was spotted near Bossembélé.
 Anti-balaka took control of Gaga and Zawa near Yaloke. Three FACA soldiers were killed in Zawa.
 Anti-balaka took control of Nandobo near Berberati kidnapping local gendarmes.
 18 December: Anti-balaka attacked Yaloké and Bossembélé. Yaloké was captured by rebels and four soldiers were killed. Bossembélé was also reportedly captured by rebels. Reinforcement was sent from Bangui to recapture Bossembélé. Boda and Mbaiki were also reportedly captured by rebels.
 19 December: MINUSCA was deployed in rebel-held Bossembélé and Bossemptele to restore peace. Gallo was captured by rebels. Heavy clashes erupted in Mbaiki between rebels and FACA supported by Russian mercenaries.
 20 December: UPC captured Grimari after bypassing MINUSCA roadblock. North of Sibut UPC advances were blocked in Gbakobanga. Rebels captured barrier in Bouar.
 21 December: Rebels took control of Baboua. Heavy clashes erupted between rebels and government forces on the road between Bossembele and Boali.
 22 December: UPC captured center of Bambari. Rebels reportedly captured Boyali. Government reinforcement was sent from Boali.
 23 December: Rebels took control of Mambere near Berberati on Nola axis. Rebels took control of Beloko and Cantonnier near Cameroonian border. Rebels withdrew from Bouar and Bambari.
 24 December: Rebels encircled Boali. Heavy clashes erupted between rebels and government forces in Bobangui near Pissa.
 25 December: Three peacekeepers were killed by unknown attackers in Bakouma and Dekoa.
 27 December: First round of general elections was held. Rebels again took control of Bouar.
 28 December: Rebels took control of Gamboula and Baoro.
 29 December: Government forces withdrew from Bakouma after being surrounded by UPC and FPRC fighters.
 30 December: Rebels withdrew from Beloko and Cantonnier. Rebels withdrew from Carnot.

2021

January 

 3 January: Rebels took control of Bangassou forcing soldiers to withdraw towards MINUSCA base according to reports.
 6 January: Government forces recaptured Bagandou killing 24 rebels. Anti-balaka rebels took control of it earlier this week.
 9 January: MINUSCA forces assisted by French jets repelled rebel attack on Bouar.
 13 January: Rebels attack the capital city, Bangui with a 200 strong force killing one UN peacekeeper, but they were repelled.
 15 January: Rebels ambushed a Burundian peacekeeper in the town of Grimari killing him and injuring two  Bangladeshi peacekeepers.
 16 January: Rebels withdrew from Bangassou.
 17 January: Rebels again took control of Bouar.
 18 January: Heavy clashes erupted between UPC rebels and MINUSCA 15 kilometers from Bangassou on Gambo axis resulting in eight rebels and three peacekeepers being killed.
 24 January: Government forces recaptured Boda from rebels.
 26 January: Government forces reportedly recaptured Boyali killing 44 rebels.
 29 January: Government forces recaptured Mpoko Ngbodo from rebels.

February 
 4 February: Government forces recaptured Bossembele.
 6 February: Government forces recaptured Yaloke.
 8 February: Government forces recaptured Baoro and Bossemptele. Rebels withdrew from Bouar.
 10 February: 
 Government forces recaptured Baboua.
 Government forces destroyed UPC checkpoint at Kombélé, 10 km from Bambari.
 Government forces recaptured Ndassima.
 11 February: Government forces recaptured Beloko border crossing from rebels.
 12 February: Government forces repelled UPC attack on Ndassima after four hour combat.
 18 February: Government forces pushed UPC rebels from Bambari.
 19 February: Government forces captured Ippy.
 20 February: 
 Rebels withdrew from Bozoum.
 CPC fighters led by Mahamat Salleh withdrew from Niyakari on Bangassou-Bakouma axis towards Nzacko and Yalinga.
 22 February: Rebels repelled attack by government forces on Bossangoa.
 23 February: Rebels repelled government attack west of Berberati.
 24 February: Government forces captured Bossangoa. Rebels returned to Bozoum.
 25 February: Government forces captured Benzambe near Bossangoa and Bozoum.
 26 February: Government forces captured Kambakota near Bossangoa.

March 

 4 March: Government forces took control of Babaza village 30 km west of Berberati and Bouca.
 5 March: Government forces captured road to Gamboula and Abba Government forces recaptured Bozoum–Paoua road.
 7 March: Government forces captured Ngakobo., Amada Gaza. and Gamboula.
 8 March: Government forces captured Kouango and Bokolobo.
 9 March: UPC rebels took control of Niakari north of Bangassou.
 11 March: Government forces recaptured Manga village between Bozoum and Bocaranga.
 12 March: Government forces recaptured Ndjoukou.
 17 March: Government forces recaptured Nanga-Boguila.
 18 March: Rebels withdrew from Ngaoundaye and Bakouma, however they remained present in the vicinity of them. Russian mercenaries took control of Alindao.
 21 March: Government forces repelled rebel attack on Bokolobo.
 22 March: Government forces recaptured Bria. One FPRC fighter was killed.
 23 March: Rebels stole seven vehicles belonging to humanitarian mission in Bakouma and forced workers to return to Bangassou.
 24 March: Government forces attacked rebel positions in Bessan near Bouar. The village was captured by government forces.
 25 March: 3R rebels returned to Ngaoundaye. Nana-Bakassa and Kouki were reported to be under government control.
 27 March: Russian mercenaries captured Mbrès from rebels, killing two rebels.
 28 March: Russian mercenaries withdrew from Mbres to Bamingui. Rebels returned to the village.

April 
 2 April: Rebels attacked Bria which was repelled. One soldiers and two rebels were killed.
 5 April: Government forces recaptured Aba town northwest of Bouar.
 6 April:
 UPC reportedly left Coalition of Patriots for Change.
 After two days of fighting government forces repelled rebel attack on Ippy.
 7 April: Government forces captured Niem.
 9 April: Russian mercenaries again arrived in Mbres forcing rebels to withdraw.
 10 April:
 Government forces recaptured Bakala and Mourouba.
 Government forces entered Kaga-Bandoro from Dekoa and Mbres. They captured the town after short exchange of fire.
 12 April: Government forces recaptured Batangafo.
 15 April: Government forces recaptured Kabo.
 16 April: Three FACA soldiers were killed near Am Dafock by Misseriya Arabs aligned with CPC.
 19 April: Government forces recaptured Moyenne-Sido and Markounda.
 22 April: Russian mercenaries took control of Yalinga.
 27 April: Russian mercenaries took control of Nzako.
 28 April: Government forces recaptured Yelowa.
 30 April: Russian forces arrived in Paviika village near Alindao after information about UPC rebels presence night before. They withdrew after murdering one man. Rebels returned and started burning homes and murdered seven people.

May 
 3 May: 3R rebels entered Berra village near Abba.
 4 May: Government forces captured Mobaye.
 5 May: Government forces repelled 3R attack on Abba.
 6 May: Government forces recaptured Dimbi, Kembe, Poumbolo and Gambo.
 8 May: 3R rebels attacked Baboua.
 10 May: Government forces recaptured Bakouma.
 11 May: Government forces destroyed rebel base on Batangafo-Bekondjo axis near border with Chad seizing equipment.
 12 May: Armed forces withdrew from Am Dafock following attacks by Misseriya Arabs.
 15 May: Heavy clashes erupted in Boyo between Russian mercenaries and UPC rebels. 20 people were killed and the village was seized by Russians day later.
 17 May: Rebels killed 10 people in Grevaï village near Kaga-Bandoro.
 18–20 May: One soldiers and multiple rebels were killed in clashes in Bemal.
 24 May: Government forces recaptured Grevaï.
 26 May: 
 3R rebels attacked army positions in Djim in Ouham-Pende killing one soldier. Attack was repelled.
 Russian mercenaries killed three rebels in Bongou village near Bria.
 27 May: 3R rebels encircled Djim forcing local population to flee. Ngaoundaye was captured by Russian mercenaries.
 28 May: 
 Rebels attacked Bozoum from three axis cutting telephone lines. Armed forces repelled attack killing one fighter.
  Three Russian mercenaries and two police officers were killed and five members of local security forces were wounded when their armored vehicle hit a land mine on the road between Berbérati and Bouar.
 29 May: Government forces recaptured Koui.
 30 May: Russian mercenaries attacked Sourou in Chad killing six soldiers. In response Chadian soldiers raided territory of Central African Republic.
 31 May: 3R rebels attacked Makounzi Wali village on Bocaranga-Bouar axis before withdrawing few hours later.

June 
 5 June: One soldiers and two rebels were killed in UPC attack on Bambari.
 10 June: 14 people were in killed in clashes between herders and farmers in Bamingui-Bangoran province.
  12 June: UPC recaptured Boyo village. Russians killed UPC general in Bokolobo village.
 19 June: Russian mercenaries took control of Aigbando killing 10 people.
 22 June: 3R rebels attack armed forces in Kaïna and Djaoro lim villages killing some of them.
 23 June: Eight armed men attacked Beltounou village near Kabo killing four people and forcing most of local population to flee to Kabo.
 24 June: Armed forces reportedly withdrew from Koui, Man, Ndim, Wouro, Soûlé and Bowaï.
 25 June: Government forces took control of Kaga-Bandoro–Ndele axis.
 27 June: Government forces recaptured Ndele.
 28 June: UPC rebels attacked Alindao.
 29 June: Armed forces repelled attack on Alindao. However, as of 1 July it was reported that UPC rebels were still present in the town.

July 
 2 July: 
 Rebels withdrew from Alindao following arrival of Russian mercenaries.
 Russians ambushed UPC rebels in Malouma forcing them to flee and killing eight of them.
 Armed forces with help of Russians recaptured Mboutago summarily executing around 30 rebels.
 8 July: Russian forces clashed with 3R rebels.
 10 July: 3R rebels erected checkpoints in Bokongo, Boyabane and Bongbalo at Bozoum-Bossemptele road.
 12 July: 3R rebels blocked road from Bozoum to Bossangoa, Paoua, Bossemptele and Bouar.
 14 July: Russians killed four FPRC rebels in Aigbando.
 15 July: CPC rebels raided Miamani village on Ndele-Golongosso axis looting local shops.
 16 July: 3R rebels withdrew from villages on roads to Bozoum and moved to mining areas near the town.
 21 July: 12 civilians were killed near Bossangoa. It's unclear who is responsible for this with Russian mercenaries, UN peacekeepers and CPC rebels being blamed.
 26 July: Two soldiers were killed in 3R attack 15 km from Yéléwa.
 26–7 July: Government forces repelled UPC attack on Obo. One soldier was killed.
 27 July: 31 FPRC fighters led by Ousta Ali surrendered their weapons in Bria. They were hiding in bush near the town since April.
 31 July: 
 15 people including five FACA soldiers were killed following clashes with 3R rebels in Mann.
 100 fighters surrendered their weapons in Bria including UPC on Yalinga axis and FPRC fighters on Ouadda axis. 50 Anti-balaka fighters led by "Bokassa" in Irabanda village surrendered with more to be disarmed in future. 100 weapons in total were collected.

August 
 5 August: Heavy clashes between 3R rebels and Russian mercenaries erupted west of Koui.
 9 August: Armed forces reportedly destroyed rebel base 1 km from place where massacre near Bossangoa happened.
 10 August: Government forces with support of Rwandans and Russians launched disarmament campaign in Ouham-Pende including Bang, Bocaranga, Koui, Ndim, Mann and Niem villages.
 17 August: 3R rebels killed two motorcycle drivers in Boyabane village on Bozoum-Bossemptele road.
 20 August: Russian forces using four helicopters attacked 3R positions west of Koui killing three people.
 23 August: Heavy clashes were ongoing between Russian mercenaries and 3R rebels in Sabewa, Bozou and other villages. At least one rebel and Russian soldier were killed. Three Russian vehicles were torched.
 24 August: 3R rebels kidnapped three people on the outskirts of Bozoum.
 25 August: Two motorcycle drivers were killed by mine explosions in Ouham-Pende.
 29 August: Around 50 3R rebels attacked Dilapoko village killing one person.
 29–31 August: In offensive against 3R rebels Russian forces bombed Beïna village in Mambere-Kadei (on 29 August), Nguia-Bouar in Baboua sub-prefecture (30 August) and Lamy-Pont in Abba sub-prefecture. Three people were killed.

September 
 1 September: 
 3R rebels attacked convoy at Beloko-Baboua road killing two people and injuring two.
 Six 3R rebels were arrested in Cameroon in Ngaoundere trying to kidnap for ransom a citizen.
 2 September: 3R rebels occupied Zoukombo village on Beloko-Baboua road. They withdrew later that day.
 3 September: 
 Two civilians and two rebels were killed in clashes between Russian mercenaries and UPC rebels in Maloum village.
 Armed forces from Bria attacked rebel base in Atongo Bakari inflicting casualties.
 5 September: 
 Government forces destroyed rebel base near Moyenne-Sido after clashing with rebels. They reportedly discovered a few surface-air missiles produced in Yugoslavia.
 Government forces discovered rebel warehouse east of Bozoum on Bata axis containing automatic weapons and ammunition.
 7 September: Russian mercenaries killed 40 Fulani herders in Nassoya village 40 km from Baboua.
 10 September: An aid worker of the Danish Refugee Council was killed and three others wounded by an IED in Ouham-Pendé.
 12 September: UPC rebels entered Kpokpo village near Yalinga before withdrawing later that day.
 13 September: Russian mercenaries using 3 helicopters landed in Gbéti village in Cameroon and Banga village in CAR. They clashes with 3R rebels. Operation continued on next day.
 14 September: 3R rebels entered Mann village pillaging local shops before withdrawing later that day.
 15 September: During operation in Mambere-Kadei near Bolambili village armed forces discovered rebel warehouse with land mines and anti-air missiles.
  16 September: New splinter group from UPC led by Hassan Bouba was reportedly created. The groups claims to have more than 700 fighters and expressed willingness to return to peace agreement with the government.
18 September: Heavy clashes erupted between Russian mercenaries and UPC rebels in Mingala.
19 September: Two soldiers were killed in rebel attack on Kakomale village near Kaga-Bandoro.
 20 September: Banga village in Mambéré-Kadéï was recaptured by 3R rebels after heavy fighting.
 22 September: One soldier was killed in UPC attack on Biadé village on Bambari-Ippy axis.
 25 September: Two people were killed and three injured by unidentified armed men on Kabo-Moyenne Sido axis.
 27 September: Russian mercenaries again captured Banga village one week after it was seized by rebels.
 28 September: Two soldiers were killed and two kidnapped in UPC attack on Kombele village near Bambari.
 30 September: Russian mercenaries attacked UPC positions near Ngakobo, in Pouloubou and Kolo. In Nagkobo, 13 civilians were killed. In Pouloubou 19 civilians and 6 UPC rebels were killed and a UPC general was injured. In Kolo an estimated 42 people were killed.

October 
 2 October: Three mercenaries and two rebels were killed in a rebel attack on a Russian convoy in Bombo in Mambéré-Kadéï.
 3 October: 
 Five civilians were killed in a land mine explosion when their motorcycle paced over it in the town of Bocaranga.
 Wagner Corp mercenaries attacked the village of Dewa killing six and wounding 13 civilians.
 5 October: 
 At least 34 people were killed in an ambush on a civilian convoy in Matchika village on Bambari-Alindao axis. Government has blamed UPC rebels, which have denied the claim. According to CorbeauNews for massacre was responsible general Kiri who was member of splinter faction of UPC led by Hassana Bouba.
 Seven humanitarian workers were kidnapped by unidentified armed men in Ngatoua village on Bouca-Batangafoa axis. Five of them were released right away and remaining two on 7 October.
 6 October: Rebels arrived in Lafolo, Pananga and Ngaboudou villages near Ippy forcing population to flee to Bria.
 7 October: 
 UPC rebels attacked Ngakobo before being repelled by FACA. Two civilians were killed.
 Nine armed rebels were arrested by armed forces in Liotto village on Grimari-Kouango axis.
 8 October: UPC rebels took control of Dimbi in Basse-Kotto.
 11 October: Five Wagner Corporation mercenaries were killed and one injured when their convoy was ambushed by 3R rebels in Banga in Mambéré-Kadéï. Three rebels were killed and others three wounded carrying out the ambush.
 12 October: 
 UPC rebels attacked government positions in Gobolo neighborhood in Bria before being repelled. Two rebels and one Russian fighter were killed. Three soldiers and four Russians were injured.
 UPC rebels attacked Ippy. Clashes lasted for a few hours.
 Two men were injured on Kabo-Moyenne Sido axis by unidentified armed men.
 13 October: A man and woman were injured on Kabo-Moyenne Sido axis by unidentified armed men.
 4–14 October: 332 fighters from FPRC, UPC, Anti-balaka and MPC surrendered in Bria. 272 firearms, 30 rockets and 40 grenades were collected.
 14 October: 
 UPC rebels attacked Alindao. Attack was repelled.
 Three soldiers were killed and five injured in 3R attack near Ngaoundaye.
 15 October:
 A vehicle was torched and a man was killed by alleged UPC rebels in Mbollo village on Bambari-Alindao axis.
 President Touadera announced unliteral ceasefire with armed groups. All armed groups except for UPC and FPRC reportedly agreed.
 16 October: Seven people were killed by Russian mercenaries in Benzambe village northeast of Bossangoa.
 19 October: Two UPC generals who wanted to surrender to the government were arrested by Ali Darassa in Boyo village.
 26 October: One person was killed by alleged 3R rebels in Kaita village near Mann.
 27 October Armed forces attacked UPC rebel positions in Balission village on Maloum-Galougou axis. A few people were killed on both sides including 10 civilians in Boïni village.
 28 October: 14 UPC soldiers and some generals including Moussa Issa left UPC to join Hassan Bouba's splinter faction.
 30 October: 
 Landmine exploded under FACA vehicle in Bondiba injuring soldiers.
 UPC rebels burned four vehicles in a attack on Dar es Salaam village near Ngakobo.
 Armed forces returned to Rafai after eight years of absence.
 31 October: 
 According to government sources, rebels used improvised drones to bomb a FACA base near Abba – first use of such technology by rebels.
 Armed forces launched an offensive against 3R rebels in Lamy-Pont and Nguia-Bouar villages. 5,000 people were displaced, 20 killed and injured including three civilians executed by Russian mercenaries near the border with Cameroon. Many homes were looted. Soldiers returned to Bouar on 7 November.

November 
 1 November: 10 Egyptian peacekeepers were injured by FACA soldiers.
 6 November: 3R rebels attacked Létélé northwest of Bocaranga. One soldier and 10 rebels were killed.
 7 November: Russian mercenaries executed UPC general Ali Tato with his wife in Shimbolo village on Bambari-Alindao axis. He was reportedly trying to surrender.
 11 November: Armed forces attacked 3R position in Bagari village near border with Cameroon killing three rebels and freeing four teenage boys kidnapped by them.
 13 November: 
 17 UPC and three Anti-balaka rebels laid down their weapons in Alindao. They were transferred to Bangui and while travelling through Bokolobo they were attacked by other UPC rebels.
 Three Fulani herders were killed by Russian mercenaries in Kpare village in Nana–Mambéré.
 14 November:
 Armed forces supported by Russians attacked 3R position in Kaïta village near Mann killing one rebel and injuring another. In response rebels attacked army in Mbae-Mbéré village nearby. One soldier, two Russian mercenaries and 12 civilians were killed. Eight civilians and three rebels were injured and one soldier was captured.
 Sudanese poachers attacked Russian mercenaries near Kouki village killing four people. In responre Russians attacked nearby mining areas killing 19 artisanal miners.
 16 November: Russian mercenaries attacked 3R rebels in Kowone village near Ndim forcing them to retreat. They killed one civilian.
 17 November: Seven soldiers were killed and two injured in 3R attack somewhere in Nana-Mambere province.
 18 November: Russian mercenaries attacked rebel positions Kparé village near Baboua. Four Russians and one 3R rebels were killed. One Anti-balaka fighter was injured.
 19 November:
 Hassan Bouba, leader of UPC faction was arrested in Bangui by gendarmerie. He was eventually released on 26 November.
 Armed forces destroyed rebel camp near Moyenne-Sido seizing weapons and ammunition.
 20 November: Five people were killed and five injured in Yidéré village near Cameroonian border by Russian mercenaries.
 21 November: 3R rebels attacked Russians in Yidéré village in Mambéré-Kadéï. Fighting lasted for two hours with killed on both sides.
 23 November: 12 people were killed by Russian mercenaries in Godawa village near Dilapoko, according to testimony of woman who survived and fled to Cameroon.
 24 November: Armed forces destroyed UPC camp led by general Garga near Bokolobo freeing one hostage. Rebels fled towards Ngakobo.
 25 November: Russian mercenaries attacked Aïgbado village near Bria killing people and livestock, burning down building and arresting 12 people.
 26 November: 15 CPC rebels allegedly surrounded and disarmed group of five MINUSCA peacekeepers on Bodjomo-Boguila road. However MINUSCA officially denied this claiming that peacekeepers repelled attack by rebels.
 28 November: 
 Five people were killed by FACA in Loura village near Bocaranga.
 (week of) 12 people were killed and 36 injured by Russian mercenaries in Ngoundja village 65 km from Bria on Sam-Ouandja axis. They were attacked for illegal artisanal mining.
 3R rebels attacked government forces in Keita village 80 km from Bocaranga. 30 people were killed including three soldiers and more than 20 civilians.
 29 November: At least 20 civilians were killed in 3R attack on Ndakaya village west of Koui.
 30 November: Two Russian mercenaries were killed in 3R attack on Yidéré village.

December 
 2 December: UPC rebels took control of Kouango after clashing with government forces. One police officer was killed and one civilian injured.
 3 December: Government forces recaptured Kouango.
 5 December: UPC rebels killed 5 civilians in Ngouroundou village on Bria-Yalinga axis.
 6 December: Eight people including seven women were reportedly lynched by Anti-balaka for witchcraft in Ndoumbou village near Bouca.
 9 December: 
 MPC rebels attacked Mbres killing one officer. It was recaptured later that day by government forces.
 Government forces repelled UPC attack on Boyo village. In response armed forces supported by pro-government faction of Anti-balaka killed 11 Muslim civilians in the village.
 10 December: 
 MINUSCA peacekeepers clashes with group of Anti-balaka fighters in Tagbara village.
 Russian mercenaries clashed with rebels in Bidja village near Batangafo. They then entered Chadian village of Djormere where they clashes with Chadian army killing one soldier and kidnapping another.
 11 December: Anti-balaka fighters from pro-government faction attacked Goya village near Kouango killing 10 civilians.
 12 December: Ali Darassa was appointed chief of staff of Coalition of Patriots for Change, two weeks after UPC officially returned to CPC.
 15 December: 
 Anti-balaka attacked Boyo killing and injuring people. MINUSCA peacekeepers were sent to the area.
 CPC rebels recaptured Nzacko following withdrawal of armed forces.
 UPC general, Didier Wangaï, was killed in clashes with pro-government faction of Anti-balaka in Gallougou village. His head was cut off and shown in Bambari.
 16 December: Pro-government faction of Anti-balaka murdered five people in Zimako village on Ippy-Galougou axis.
 18 December: 
 3R rebels clashes with armed forces in Mann occupying the town until the next morning. One rebels, one soldier and four civilians were killed.
 Unidentified armed men occupied Ndjoukou for two days.
 20–21 December: 100 UPC rebels surrendered in Alindao, including four generals.
 23 December: UPC rebels entered Boyo.
 25 December: 
  Two men were killed by CPC rebels in attack on truck on Batangafo-Kabo axis.
 18 people were killed and 29 injured by pro-government faction of Anti-balaka in Lougba and Mandjo village on Bambari-Bakala axis.
 MINUSCA peacekeepers launched operation in Boyo forcing around 200 UPC fighters to withdraw.
 28 December: Five people were injured in 3R attack on Bezéré. Two civilians were injured in another attack on Mbinaï village near Cameroon.
 29 December: 
 UPC attacked Ngakobo killing one gendarme and occupying the town until withdrawing after reinforcement arrived.
 FACA soldier was killed near Bouca. According to some sources he was killed in battle with CPC rebels, while according to others he was killed by Russians after being mistaken for CPC rebel.
 30 December: Three MINUSCA peacekeepers were injured in landmine explosion in near Batouri Bole village in Mambéré-Kadéï.
 31 December: 
 Three MINUSCA peacekeepers were injured in mine explosion in Bohong village in Ouham-Pende.
 Around 50 3R rebels invaded Bania village in Mambéré-Kadéï.

2022

January 
 2 January: 
 3R rebels and armed forces clashes in Djakoundou village in Ouham-Pende. One rebel and some soldiers were killed. Two civilians were killed, five injured and 20 hourses burnt.
 3R rebels attacked Létélé killing at least two soldiers.
 4 January: 
 Armed forces and CPC rebels clashed in Kambakota. Four rebels were killed.
 Four people were killed by Russian mercenaries in Bria.
 6 January: 90 UPC rebels including general Robo surrendered in Ngakobo.
 9 January: Two civilians were killed in Ouham-Pende, one in Boina village by 3R rebels, other in Boyabane village by FACA soldiers.
 11 January: Three civilians were killed and six injured by Chadian mercenaries in Kare village on Batangafo-Kambakota axis.
 14 January: 
 UPC rebels and pro-government faction of Anti-balaka clashes in Yagoundaba village on Ippy-Kollo axis. 10-12 Anti-balaka fighters were killed.
 3R rebels attacked Herbo village near Chadian border burning down hundreds of homes and displacing thousands of people.
 16 January: Russian mercenaries conducted operation in Aïgbado village against UPC rebels. During the operation they killed around 65 civilians. Two Russians were killed.
 18 January: Russian mercenaries and UPC rebels clashes in Nguipa village on Bokolobo-Lema axis.
 22 January: 
 Armed Fulanis attacked Ketté-Sido village in Ouham killing three people.
 3R rebels ambushed Russian mercenaries near Yelowa village in Ouham-Pende.
 24 January: At least 11 people were killed in attack by Russian mercenaries on Sabo village near border with Chad.
  29 January: Armed forces clashed with UPC rebels in Boyo village injuring a few rebels.

February 
 1 February: UPC rebels attacked Atongo Bakari village killing three people.
 2 February: Pro-government faction of Anti-balaka attacked Komayo village near Boyo killing seven people. In response UPC rebels attacked them. Four Anti-balaka and one UPC militiamen were killed.
 7 February: Six people were killed and one injured by unknown gunmen in Nguia-Bouar.
 9 February: 90 civilians were allegedly killed by Russian mercenaries in Mouka and Yangoudroudja villages in Haute-Kotto. However other sources denied this.
 12 February: Damane Zakaria, leader of RPRC armed groups was killed with 20 rebels in Ouadda by Russian mercenaries.
 13 February: Four people were killed and three injured after armed men suspsected to be 3R rebels set fire to homes in Touga village near Ngaoundaye.
  17 February: Around 100 Russian mercenaries arrived in Sam Ouandja causing local population to flee to Birao.
 18 February: 3R rebels attacked Gadzi town displacing and injuring many people.
 20 February: Armed forces repelled UPC attack on Alindao.
 24 February: 
 UPC rebels clashes with Anti-balakas in Mbiakreu village near Ippy, at least nine people were killed.
 UPC rebels attack public vehicle on road from Ippy looting them.
 MINUSCA forces launched operation in Ouandago village arresting 11 self-defense fighters armed with artisanal weapons.
 25 February: Anti-balaka fighters attacked merchants killing one person and kidnapping and looting others in Gbakara village on Bossangoa-Bouca axis.

March 
 3 March: 
 A truck carrying four people struck an IED in Ouham-Péndé prefecture killing two and injuring two.
 After rebel injured a motorcycle driver, armed forces destroyed their base between Gaïkouda and Bezambé.
 5 March: Russian mercenaries captured Nzacko village clashing with FPRC rebels. 2 Russians and 5 rebels were killed.
 6–9 March: Armed forces conducted operations against rebels from CPC in Ndah in Vakaga as well as on N'dele-Chari axis where they clashed with local herders in Tiri.
 8 March: FPRC rebels recaptured Nzacko village after Wagner mercenaries left the town.
  10 March: UPC leader Colonel Djibril was assassinated by his own men out of suspicion of colluding with the Russians.
 11 March: Russian mercenaries and FPRC rebels clashes in Gounda village near N'dele. Four Russians, six rebels and two civilians were killed. Rebels withdrew from the village and Russians continued to Gordile, where they killed at least 15 people. They also arrived in Tirigoulou where they killed 12 people including former FPRC general. 
 12 March: At least 17 civilians were killed by Russian mercenaries in Kota-Gbaya near Markounda.
 14 March: Rwandan forces attacked rebel position in Ramadan village on Bamingui-Mbrés axis killing two rebels.
 15 March: 
 Armed clashes between Russians who arrived from N'dele and rebels in Sikikede village. At least 20 people were killed on both sides. They later went on to Birao before returning to N'dele.
 Armed forces supported by Russian mercenaries arrived in Ouanda Djallé village in Vakaga.
 18 March: Armed forces repelled CPC attack on Bouca.
 22 March: 3R rebels took control of Nzakoundou village after battle with government forces.
 23 March: 3R rebels attacked mining site near Nguia-Bouar killing two people.
 25 March: 
 Four 3R rebels were killed by Russian mercenaries near border with Chad. Nzakoundou village was recaptured by government forces.
 Rebels occupied Sans Souci village on Bria-Ouadda axis. Some people fled the village.
 27 March: Government forces again recaptured Nzacko.
 29 March: Government forces clashed with FPRC rebels in Gbolo village nar Bakouma. One person was injured.
 30 March: 
 CPC rebels occupied Yangou-Mango village on Bria-Ippy axis blocking movement.
 UPC rebels attacked travelling people in Tagbia village on Bambari-Alindao axis looting their belongings.

April 
 1 April: 
 Four people were murdered by FPRC rebels in Kono village on Nzacko-Bakouma axis. They also kidnapped six people.
 A merchant was killed by CPC rebels on Bossangoa-Benzambé axis, they stole his motorcycle.
 2 April: A few merchants were kidnapped by CPC rebels in Zeré village on Bossangoa-Bouca axis. Some of them were injured with bullets.
 3 April: 
 One police officer was shot dead by suspected CPC rebels in Ngouaboutou village on Bria-Ippy axis.
 3R rebels attacked Samoh village on Boguila-Bozoum axis killing five people. Day later they set fire to a few houses in nearby Boaya village.
 3–8 April: 3R rebels attacked civilian population in villages near Gadzi killing tens of people and displacing more than one thousand.
 5 April: 
 CPC rebels attacked Ngbagueré village 70 km from Ippy killing three people.
 CPC rebels atatcked bishop near Nana-Bakassa stealing his belongings.
 7 April: CPC rebels attacked humanitarian convoy on Alindao-Mingala axis injuring five people.
 8 April: 
 Anti-balaka fighters attacked a Fulani camp in Zawa near Yaloke, killing at least a dozen people.
 9 April: Armed men attacked a humanitarian vehicle in Nzeleté village on Alindao-Bambari axis, injuring two people.
 11 April: 
 13 people were killed by pro-government faction of Anti-balaka in Fulani camp in Bekadili village near Yaloke.
 Russian mercenaries killed between 10 and 22 people and burned motorcycles in Gordila and Ndah villages in Vakaga. UN launched investigation into the killings.
 13 April: Armed men ambushed healthcare workers in Koui stealing medications, cash, motorcycles and cell phones.
 14 April: Armed Chadians attacked Gbazara village on Batangafo-Kabo axis injuring two women.
 16 April: Russian mercenaries clashes with 3R rebels west of Amada-Gaza town near border with Cameroon. One rebel was killed, one rebel and one Russian injured, rebels withdrew from the position.
 17 April: A South Sudanese citizen was killed by UPC rebels in Bambouti.
 18 April: Cameroon deployed hundreds of troops to the eastern border with C.A.R. to free hostages who were kidnapped by rebels operating at the border. 35 people were kidnapped by them in previous three weeks.
 22 April: Group of armen men entered Batangafo trying to loot local merchant. Armed forces arrived and repelled them>
 23 April: Six people including local imam were killed by Russian mercenaries in Ndassima.
 24 April: 
 Armed rebels attacked a humanitarian convoy on Batangafo-Ouandago axis stealing belongings. They also attacked motorcycle drivers on Batangafo-Kambakota axis injuring two people.
 Pro-government faction of Anti-balaka invaded Tambia village on Bambari-Alindao axis arresting one person and displacing local population.
 25 April: Russians supported by armed forces attacked a UPC position in Lioto villages, killing two rebels. One Russian was injured.
 27–28 April: Armed forces conducted operation against Anti-balaka, FPRC and MPC rebels around Kouki allegedly killing around 17 civilians and injuring some.
 28 April: 11 soldiers and three rebels were killed in rebel attack on Nzacko.
 29 April: 3R rebels looted belongings of 200 people on Abba-Gallo axis injuring one person.

May 
 7 May: Russian mercenaries and armed forces clashed with 3R rebels 90 km from Gadzi on Zawa axis forcing them to withdraw. 200 people were displaced by the clashes.
 8 May: FPRC general Moctar Adam was gunned down by Russian mercenaries in N'délé together with his two brothers while trying to evade arrest. Five people were injured including at least one soldier.
 9 May: UPC rebels launched attacks on two checkpoints outside Bokolobo. Two soldiers, three UPC rebels, eight militiamen from the pro-government faction of Anti-balaka and one woman were killed. Afterwards pro-government forces allegedly murdered 23 people in Fulani camp.
 11 May: 
 MINUSCA and armed forces announced an joint operation in Bambari against armed groups in Mingala.
 FPRC and UPC rebels took control of Ouadda. Five soldiers were killed, six injured and 13 captured by rebels.
 15 May: Armed forces repelled 3R attack on Nzakoundou killing three attackers. In Sam Ouandja UPC rebels stabbed a trader.
 20 May: 
 Chadian mercenaries looted truck on Batanagafo-Bouca axis kidnapping one person for ransom.
 Pro-government faction of Anti-balaka kidnapped mayor of Tambia village and killed his son.
 21 May: 
 FPRC rebels attacked Nzacko forcing soldiers to withdraw. 11 soldiers and two rebels were killed. One soldiers was captured and six rebels were injured.
 Three Chadian mercenaries were killed by armed forces on Batangafo-Ouandago axis.
 22 May: 
 UPC rebels attacked Digui crossing near Ngakobo killing six soldiers and injuring five. Then they captured Ngakobo. 11 soldiers were killed, some injured and captured, at least six escaped.
 Russian mercenaries killed five people and injured 12 in Ndah village in Vakaga.
 23 May: 
 Rebels withdrew from Nzacko ahead of arrival of Russian mercenaries.
 After Ndah Russian mercenaries arrived in Gordile and Ndiffa in Vakaga.
 24 May: Seven people were killed by unidentified armed men outside of Nana-Bakassa.
 25 May: Russian mercenaries arrived in Tiringoulou causing local population to flee to bush. After that they looted houses.
 26 May: 
 Russian mercenaries returned to Ndiffa and Gordile where they have stolen a pick up and looted shops.
 Three Russians were injured in ambush by 3R rebels in Kaita village near Koui.
 27 May: 
 Two Russian mercenaries were killed and four injured in a rebel ambush in Djouwè village near Bossemptele.
 Group of armed forces were deployed in Ouadda-Djalle.
 28 May: Russians looted a market in Sikikede.
 30 May: 3R rebels destroyed two trucks near Bocaranga killing some soldiers.
 31 May: A motorcycle driver was shot dead by Chadian mercenaries on Batangafo-Ouandago axis.

June 
 5 June: One soldier was killed and other captured by 3R rebels in Doko village on Bocaranga-Bang axis.
 7 June: Armed forces went to Goya. They clashed with UPC rebels north of Goya for two days after which they occupied Goya for three days looting shops and killing one person.
 8 June: 3R rebels again killed one soldier and captured another in Doko village.
 11 June: 
 Soldier together with a woman he was driving with were killed by unidentified armed men in Zarami village on Gallo axis.
 Local self-defense group clashed with CPC rebels in Ndiki village. Two rebels and two self-defense fighters were killed.
 12 June:
 Russian mercenaries set fire to mosque in Nguekpa village after group of CPC rebels took refuge inside, killing four men and injuring two women.
 13 June:
 Armed forces supported by Russians captured Dimbi after clashing with rebels.
 Armed forces attacked rebels in Sébagoudé village in Basse-Kotto killing 20 of them and capturing rebel camps.
 14 June: MINUSCA peacekeepers were deployed until 30 August in Bakouma and Nzacko to protect from rebel attacks.
 17 June: RPRC, FPRC and UPC rebels took control of Ouadda-Djalle village after clashing with armed forces and killing at least one pro-government fighter. Local population fled to bush.
 23 June: Armed forces repelled CPC attack on Bakouma. Six rebels and one civilian were killed.
 26 June: Armed forces recaptured Ouanda-Djalle after clashing with rebels.

July 
 3 July: Armed forces repelled rebel attack on Dimbi killing 12 rebels and capturing five.
 14 July: UPC took control of Kembé.
 16 July: Rebels withdrew from Kembé following arrival of MINUSCA forces.
 18 July: Armed forces destroyed Anti-balaka base in Ewou village in Basse-Kotto prefecture arresting two people. Anti-balaka commander Nguiambi fled.
  30 July: Multiple rebel groups including FPRC, UPC and RPRC arrived in Gordil village in Vakaga.

August 
 1 August: Four people including police officer were shot dead near Moyenne Sido by armed men.
 2 August: Two people were killed by 3R rebels in Lokoti-Bangi village near Baboua.
 3 August: 3R rebels killed four civilians in Ndiba village near Baboua.
 4 August: 3R rebels killed young boy on Nana-Bakassa–Kouki axis. Armed forces attacked Poussierre mine nearby killing one Anti-balaka fighter.
 6 August: Soldier was killed and another injured by Anti-balaka fighters from CPC near Lady village on Bouca-Batangafo axis.
 17 August: Six armed men were killed by armed forces near Batangafo. Two civilians were killed by armed men.
 18 August: CPC rebels withdrew from Sam Ouandja following arrival of MINUSCA peacekeepers.
 22 August: 
 Russian mercenaries arrived in Akoursoulbak village in Bamingui-Bangoran, looting shops, before withdrawing the next day.
 3R rebels kidnapped group of people in village on Bozoum-Bossemptele axis.
 29 August: Armed rebels looted two groups of people near Bouca and Batangafo.

September 
 2 September: CPC rebels attacked Akoursoulbak. After day of heavy fighting rebels managed to expel armed forces from the town before withdrawing on 4 September.
 9 September: CPC rebels attacked Aigbando near Bria. After two days of fighting they managed to take control of the town.
 13 September: Armed forces repelled CPC attack on Gobolo neighborhood in Bria. CPC rebels attacked Kpassoro village near Bria displacing around 500 people.

October 
 3 October: Three MINUSCA peacekeepers were killed and one injured in mine explosion in Koui.
 7 – 12 October: 10 people were killed including three civilians in clashes between two Anti-balaka factions in Ndjoukou. Clashes were between pro-government faction led by Ayoloma and pro-CPC faction led by Sioni Mènè.
 9 October: CPC rebels clashes with armed forces near Markounda with killed and injured on both sides.
 13 October: Two soldiers were killed and one captured in rebel attack on Ndiba Molé village near Gallo.
 15 October: 
 Self-defense fighters killed one Misseriya attacker and captured another while they were trying to steal motorcycles in village near Birao.
 Further clashes between two factions of Anti-balaka occurred in Mourou Kozo village near Ndjoukou.
 17 October: Armed forces launched attack on UPC position in Kembe with killed and injured on both sides.
 19 October: Armed forces repelled 3R attack on Mann. One civilian was killed and six people including two soldiers were injured.
 20 October: Five people were kidnapped by Misseriya Arabs from Am Dafock.
 22 October: 10 Chadian mercenaries were killed by armed forces near Batangafo.
 23 October: 3R rebels attacked Mann forcing soldiers to withdraw. 100 houses were burnt by rebels and three civilians killed by soldiers.

November 
 1 November: CPC rebels attacked Bokolobo kidnapping three soldiers.
 2 November: CPC rebels attacked soldiers in Koumbélé village 10 km from Bambari.
 3 November: Two men were shot dead by suspected UPC rebels in forest near Dimbi.
 4 November: Russian paratroopers raided CPC base in Blakadja village killing one rebel.
 6 November: 
 One person was killed and two injured in ambush by unidentified armed men on vehicle on Bambari-Ippy axis.
 Rebels ambushed armed forces in Simbolo village near Bambari.
 8 November: UPC rebels attacked armed forces in Ngakobo village.
 (week of) 9 November: Group of young traders was murdered by rebels on N'dele-Sarh axis.
 11 November: PRNC rebels kidnapped three government workers in Ndiffa village in Vakaga province.
 17 November: UPC rebels attacked Ngouaboudou village on Bria-Ippy axis driving out armed forces. Rebels promptly withdrew from the town. After 24 hours armed forces clashed with them killing two rebels and injuring many others.
 18 November: Two traders were kidnapped by 3R rebels on the outskirs of Bocaranga.
 19 November: UPC launched attack on Kouango. The attack was repelled, with one soldier being wounded.
 22 November: Armed forces were deployed in Ndjoukou after three months of Anti-balaka infighting.
 25 November: Unidentified armed men invaded Maloum village in Ouaka looting houses.
 27 November: Sudanese fighters, members of CPC, attacked Am Dafock looting gendarmerie building. They withdrew few hours later due to pressure of local population.
 28 November: 
 Unknown aircraft struck Russian base in Bossangoa causing damage. Russians responded by firing at it. Two vehicles were burnt and several houses damaged.
 Anti-balaka rebels attacked vehicle with Chinese workers on Niem-Yelewa axis, kidnapping two people and killing one soldiers.

December 
 1 December: 11 people were killed and seven injured by UPC rebels in Kolo village on Bakouma-Bangassou axis.
 4 December: Four armed groups (MLCJ, RPRC, UFR and UFR-R) signed in Bangui an agreement announcing their dissolution.
 7 December: 
 A trader was robbed and beaten to death in a village 35 km from Mbrès by unidentified armed men.
 Armed forces and Russian allies took full control of Birao, former headquarters of MLCJ.
 8–9 December: Armed forces clashed with CPC rebels in Akocho village on Bria-Ndéle axis. In total 24 rebels, 13 pro-government fighters and nine (including two captured and later killed) Wagner mercenaries were killed. Six pro-government fighters were captured by rebels.
 10–11 December: UPC rebels attacked Boyo village on 10 December and Liotto day later in Ouaka. Two rebels and six soldiers were killed and weapons seized by rebels. Armed forces returned to both villages after a few hours. One civilian was killed in Liotto.
 12 December: Rebels attacked Bokolobo village, temporarily seizing it. Two attackers and one civilian were killed. One soldier was injured.
 14 December: UPC rebels torched vehicle of minister Amit Idriss on Bambari-Ngakobo axis.
 15 December:
 Three people were kidnapped by armed men near Bokolobo village.
 Last French troops left the Central African Republic.
 16 December: Two people were kidnapped by unknown armed men near Ouanda Djalle.
 17 December: UPC rebels attacked Ngakobo occupying it temporarily.
 20 December: Two Chadian fighters were killed by armed forces in Kérengué village near Batangafo.
 23 December: Four soldiers were killed and three injured in rebel attack near Gallo village. Three rebels were killed in attack by soldier on Ngbada village.
  25 December: Nine armed pick-ups and a few dozens of motorcycles were reportedly handed over to PRNC rebels in Ndiffa, Tiringoulou and Gordil villages in Vakaga province.
 29–30 December: Rebels attacked twice army position in Goya village in Ouaka. Around the same week there were also attacks in Aïgbado abd Akoursoulbak villages. One vehicle was torched and people were killed and injured on both sides.

2023

January 
 4 January: Armed men looted vehicle in Gouzé village on Paoua-Bozoum axis. Next day they attacked motorcycle drivers in Kparé village killing one person.
 4–12 January: In series of three attacks on Birao–Ouanda-Djallé axis by unidentified armed men, one person was killed and several were robbed including a humanitarian convoy.
 6 January: Russian mercenaries attacked UPC rebels in Goya village killing three of them.
 7 January: CPC rebels ambushed armed forces in Yenga village near Boaur. Two soldiers were killed and two captured, one civilian was injured.
 9 January: Four soldiers and three Russians were killed in a clash between the two groups in Digui.
 12 January: 3R and Anti-balaka rebels attacked Abba. One soldier was killed and another injured. Attack was repelled.
 14 January: Two Russian mercenaries and three rebels were killed in 3R attack on Yidéré site in Nana-Mambéré.
 16 January: 
 Armed men attacked seven motorcycle drivers on Birao-Ouanda Djalle axis. Three escaped with one being shot, while four were looted.
 Alleged 3R rebels invaded Kowone village kidnapping two people. One of them was eventually released on 19 January after payment of 11 million CFA francs in ransom.
 18 January: Rebels occupied Linguiri village on Bamingui-M'brés axis where they assaulted and robbed local trader.
 21 January: CPC rebels attacked Béloko. Two Russian mercenaries and one civilian were killed. One soldier was injured and custom building was burned down.
 23 January: 
 CPC rebels attacked Ngarba village near Ndélé injuring one soldier. They withdrew after a few hours.
 3R rebels robbed group of traders near Bokayan village shooting one dead who tried to escape.
 24 January: 
 3R rebels attacked Besson killing one soldier.
 Deputy of representative from Ngaoundaye was kidnapped near the village by 3R rebels. He was eventually released a few days later.
 25 January: 3R rebels attacked armed forces in Bondiba in Nana-Mambéré forcing them to withdraw.
 25–6 January: Armed forces and Russian mercenaries attacked Gordil and Ndomboloye villages in Vakaga. Rebels surrounded them forcing them to withdraw to N'délé. During clashes a few people were killed and injured on both sides, two government vehicles were destroyed and two Russians and one soldier were captured by rebels. During clashes in Gounda two Russians and four soldiers were killed a dozen others wounded. Rebel general was wounded while trying to apprehend wounded Russian fighter.
 28 January: Government forces took control of Gounda, Gordil and Ndah after clashing with rebels. Dozens people were killed including seven Russian mercenaries.

February 
 7 February: Two soldiers were killed and three injured in mine explosion on Ndim-Kowone axis.
 8 February: CPC rebels invaded Banguéla village on Bakala–Bambari axis, robbing local population before withdrawing to bush.
 10 February: Six people including two priests were injured in mine explosion in the Ouham-Péndé prefecture.
 14 February: CPC rebels recaptured Ndah, killing 16 soldiers and capturing 24. One rebel was killed and four injured.
 17 February: After withdrawing from Gordil, government forces bombed the town with helicopters causing most civilian population and rebels to leave.
 23 February: Pro-government forces were redeployed in Sikikédé.
 25 February: A soldier was killed and a few Russians were injured in mine explosion in Ouham-Pende region.
 27 November: Two Russian mercenaries were killed and two soldiers injured by CPC rebels near Yenga village in Nana-Mambéré prefecture.

March
 4 March: Rebels attacked a truck near Nana-Bakassa injuring a few people.
 8 March: Three workers kidnapped by PRNC rebels in November 2022 were fred.
 13 March: Three Chinese national were kidnapped by armed men near Abba in Nana-Mambéré prefecture.
 15 March: 
 Self-defense militia captured Bambouti after clashing with UPC rebels during which one rebel general was killed.
 Three civilians were killed and at least three wounded as a result of rebel attack on Wawa village in Ouaka. Attack was repelled.
 16 March: Cardinal Dieudonné Nzapalainga was kidnapped by alleged PRNC rebels near Ouadda.
 19 March: Gunmen attacked Chimbolo mining site near Bambari killing nine Chinese nationals. CPC rebels denied responsibility.

References 

Lists of armed conflicts in the 21st century
Timelines of current events
Central African Republic Civil War